Alexander Timiryov (born March 10, 1994) is a Russian professional ice hockey player. He is currently playing with HC Yugra of the Supreme Hockey League (VHL).

On January 5, 2015, Timiryov made his Kontinental Hockey League debut playing with HC Neftekhimik Nizhnekamsk during the 2014–15 KHL season.

On June 14, 2021, the Metallurg hockey club from the Belarusian Zhlobin announced the signing of a contract with Timirev

References

External links

1994 births
Living people
HC Lada Togliatti players
HC Neftekhimik Nizhnekamsk players
Rubin Tyumen players
Russian ice hockey forwards
HC Yugra players